Mihai Eminescu was a Romanian poet.

Eminescu may also refer to:

9495 Eminescu, an asteroid named after Mihai Eminescu
Eminescu (crater), a crater on Mercury named after Mihai Eminescu

See also
Mihai Eminescu Statue, Montreal
Mihai Eminescu commune, Botoşani County, Romania
Mihai Eminescu, a village in Gorbănești Commune, Botoşani County, Romania
Mihai Eminescu National College (disambiguation)